Kesso Barry (born 1948) is a Guinean autobiographical writer in French. Her autobiography, dedicated to her daughter, recounts the restrictive gender roles of her traditional upbringing as a member of the Fulani nobility in Guinea-Conakry, and her escape to a Westernised life in Paris.

Life
Kesso Barry's father was Al Hajj Ibrahima Sory-Dara, almamy of Mamou. She was educated in Koranic and primary schools in Mamou, before continuing education in Conakry and Dakar. She married aged 15, and had two children. In 1966, after divorcing her husband, she moved to Paris. There she pursued a successful career in fashion, married a Frenchman, and wrote her autobiographical novel.

Works
 Kesso, princesse peuhle [Kesso, a Fulani princess], Paris: Seghers, 1988.

References

Further reading
 Irène Assiba d'Almeida, 'Kesso Barry's Kesso, or Autobiography as a Subverted Tale', Research in African Literatures Vol. 28, No. 2 (Summer, 1997), pp. 66–82
 Edgard Sankara, L’appropriation du masculin dans Kesso, princesse peuhle de Kesso Barry, Itinéraires, No. 1 (2008). Retrieved 24 December 2016. DOI: 10.4000/itineraires.2221

External links
 Kesso Barry Decoster: An author from Fouta-Djalon writing in French

1948 births
Living people
Guinean writers
Guinean women writers
Autobiographers
Women autobiographers